Márcio "Macarrão" Stambowsky (born February 22, 1959) is a Brazilian martial artist. An 8th degree coral belt in Gracie Jiu-Jitsu, he is one of the "Famous Five" Rolls Gracie black belts. Regarded as one of the top Brazilian competitors of the 1980s, he is also the father of professional Bellator MMA fighter Neiman Gracie Stambowsky.

Technical contributions
During the formative years of Brazilian Jiu-Jitsu, Stambowsky was notable for revolutionizing the closed guard, triangles, and leglock tactics. He was named by MMA hall-of-famer Rickson Gracie as one of the original Brazilian competitors to popularize the concept of the now iconic triangle choke. Acclaimed as an influential mentor and coach, he has been credited by world champion Renzo Gracie for practicing "one of the most beautiful jiu jitsu [styles] ever seen."

Athletic achievements
In 1980, Stambowsky was selected to join a group of top fighters that the Brazilian government planned to send to the Olympic Games in Moscow and the Pan American Games in the United States. Although a dispute involving sponsors prevented the team from traveling to the Olympics, Stambowsky went on to win two gold medals in national championship competitions in 1981 and 1985.

He won a bronze medal in a world championship competition, representing Brazil among 37 countries at the 1985 Maccabiah Games in Israel.

Personal life
Marcio was born to a Holocaust survivor mother and a Russian father who later emigrated to Brazil. He is the highest ranking Jewish BJJ practitioner.  Keeping close ties with the Gracies,
Stambowsky eventually married Carla Gracie, daughter of Robson Gracie.  In addition to his son Neiman, he has one daughter, Deborah Gracie Stambowsky, who, together with Kyra Gracie, is one of only two women in the Gracie family to have attained the rank of black belt. Stambowsky moved his family from Brazil to the United States in 2007. He is the founder of Gracie Sports USA and Team Macarra BJJ, based in Norwalk, Connecticut.

Lineage 
Kano Jigoro → Tomita Tsunejiro → Mitsuyo Maeda → Carlos Gracie → Hélio Gracie → Rolls Gracie → Márcio Stambowsky

See also
 Rolls Gracie
 Neiman Gracie
 Gracie family
 Brazilian Jiu-Jitsu
 List of Brazilian Jiu-Jitsu practitioners

References 

Brazilian practitioners of Brazilian jiu-jitsu
Living people
1959 births
Gracie family
Maccabiah Games bronze medalists for Brazil
Sportspeople from Rio de Janeiro (city)
Brazilian expatriate sportspeople in the United States
Brazilian people of Russian-Jewish descent
Jewish male martial artists
Brazilian male judoka
Brazilian jiu-jitsu trainers
Mixed martial arts trainers
Maccabiah Games medalists in judo
Competitors at the 1985 Maccabiah Games
Jewish Brazilian sportspeople
People awarded a coral belt in Brazilian jiu-jitsu